Stadionul Național ("The National Stadium") was a multi-purpose stadium in Bucharest, Romania. The stadium held 60,120 people.

History
It was built in 1953, for the 4th World Festival of Youth and Students. According to the book București published in 1968 by Institutul Proiect București, Complexul Sportiv August 23 was designed by the well known architect Vily Juster.

It was first known as Stadionul August 23, and later on as Stadionul Național. The sports complex that included Național Stadium, is named Lia Manoliu (1932–1998) after the famous Romanian athlete.

It was used mostly for football matches.

It hosted numerous concerts after the 1989 Revolution, including Michael Jackson's Dangerous World Tour concert on October 1, 1992 90,000 Public, as well as the  HIStory World Tour concert on September 14, 1996. 70,000 public

In October 2005, it was decided to rebuild the stadium completely; however, initially no funding was found, so some repairs proceeded in lieu of rebuilding. Later, funds became available and the rebuilding is expected to begin in November 2007. The plan calls for completion of a new five-star arena by April 2010. The last football match played was a 6–1 win against Albania on November 21, 2007. After the match, a few seats were removed from the stadium, as a symbolic start of the rebuilding operations. The stadium has subsequently been demolished to make room for a new one.

Attendance
List of matches of Romania national football team on National Stadium (former August 23), with more than 50,000 persons.

References

External links
 Cum s-a născut Stadionul "23 august" 
 Naţional Arena: istoria fascinantă a "celui mai mare stadion al ţării" 
 Vezi cine au fost cei care au făcut din Groapa Vergului "cel mai mare stadion al ţării" 

FC Steaua București
Defunct football venues in Romania
Demolished buildings and structures in Bucharest
Multi-purpose stadiums in Romania
Sports venues completed in 1953
1953 establishments in Romania
Sports venues demolished in 2008